Anastasia Pavlyuchenkova was the defending champion, but lost in the quarterfinals to Dominika Cibulková.

Cibulková went on to win the title, defeating Viktorija Golubic in the final, 6–3, 7–5.

Seeds

Draw

Finals

Top half

Bottom half

Qualifying

Seeds

Qualifiers

Draw

First qualifier

Second qualifier

Third qualifier

Fourth qualifier

References 
 Main draw
 Qualifying draw

Generali Ladies Linz - Singles
Generali Ladies Linz Singles